At the 1924 Summer Olympics in Paris, nine events in gymnastics were contested, all for men only. The competitions were held from 17 July 1924 to 24 July 1924.

Medal summary

Participating nations
A total of 72 gymnasts from nine nations competed at the Paris Games:

Medal table

References

Sources
 

 
1924
1924 Summer Olympics events
Gymnastics in Paris
International gymnastics competitions hosted by France
1924 in gymnastics